For the First Time is a 1967 Cuban documentary short film. It chronicles the events of April 12, 1967 in the village of Los Munos, in the Baracoa municipality of Cuba, where a mobile cinema truck shows the villagers moving pictures for the first time.

Overview 
The entire film was shot on April 12, 1967 in the village itself, and shows the cinema truck traveling to the village, as well as interviews with both the projectionists and several villagers. The film shown was the Chaplin feature, Modern Times, on a portable 16 mm projector in the back of the truck. As it happens, the film screening is well received.

The film was made available in recent years for an international audience with it being included as a special feature in a MK2 DVD release of Modern Times, distributed by Warner Brothers, as well as on the Criterion Collection release.

Cast

See also 
 List of Cuban films

References

External links
 
 

1967 films
1967 documentary films
1967 short films
1960s Spanish-language films
Cuban documentary films